Flavocrambus is a genus of moths of the family Crambidae.

Species
Flavocrambus aridellus (South in Leech & South, 1901)
Flavocrambus melaneurus (Hampson, 1919)
Flavocrambus picassensis Bleszynski, 1965
Flavocrambus striatellus (Leech, 1889)

References

Crambinae
Crambidae genera
Taxa named by Stanisław Błeszyński